The Journal of Health and Social Behavior is a quarterly peer-reviewed academic journal published by SAGE Publications on behalf of  the American Sociological Association. It covers the application of sociological concepts and methods to the understanding of health and illness and the organization of medicine and health care. The editor-in-chief is Amy Burdette (Florida State University). Previous editors-in-chief include Richard M. Carpiano (University of California, Riverside), Brian C. Kelly (Purdue University), Gilbert Gee (University of California, Los Angeles), Debra Umberson (University of Texas at Austin), and Eliza Pavalko (Indiana University).

Abstracting and indexing 
The journal is abstracted and indexed in AgeLine, Applied Social Science Index and Abstracts, Education Resources Information Center, MEDLINE/PubMed, PsycINFO, Science Citation Index, Scopus, and Social Sciences Citation Index. According to the Journal Citation Reports, the journal has a 2018 impact factor of 2.419, ranking it 20th out of 63 journals in the category "Psychology, Social" and 39th out of 164 journals in "Public, Environmental & Occupational Health".

References

External links 
 

Publications established in 1960
Sociology journals
Quarterly journals
English-language journals
Public health journals
SAGE Publishing academic journals
Social psychology journals
American Sociological Association academic journals